William F. Coplan was an American politician from Pennsylvania who served in the Pennsylvania State Senate, representing the 18th district for five years from 1837 to 1842 as a Jackson Democrat. During his tenure, the 18th district represented the counties of Fayette and Greene in Western Pennsylvania.

Coplan played an important part of the development of the National Road as, following an act of legislature from the Pennsylvania General Assembly on April 4, 1831, would be named one of the two commissioners of the Cumberland Road which would become the Pennsylvania stretch of the National Road.

References

1795 births